Liu Hongmei (born 27 December 1973) is a Chinese ice hockey player. She competed in the women's tournaments at the 1998 Winter Olympics and the 2002 Winter Olympics.

References

1973 births
Living people
Chinese women's ice hockey players
Ice hockey players at the 1998 Winter Olympics
Ice hockey players at the 2002 Winter Olympics
Olympic ice hockey players of China
Place of birth missing (living people)
Asian Games gold medalists for China
Ice hockey players at the 1999 Asian Winter Games
Medalists at the 1999 Asian Winter Games
Asian Games medalists in ice hockey